Del altar a la tumba, is a 1969 Mexican telenovela produced by Televisa and originally transmitted by Telesistema Mexicano.

Cast 
Alicia Rodríguez
 
Liliana Durán
Anita Blanch

References

External links 

Mexican telenovelas
Televisa telenovelas
Spanish-language telenovelas
1969 telenovelas
1969 Mexican television series debuts
1969 Mexican television series endings